A ship's hold or cargo hold is a space for carrying cargo in the ship's compartment.

Description 
Cargo in holds may be either packaged in crates, bales, etc., or unpackaged (bulk cargo). Access to holds is by a large hatch at the top. Ships have had holds for centuries; an alternative way to carry cargo is in standardized shipping containers, which may be loaded into appropriate holds or carried on deck.

Holds in older ships were below the orlop deck, the lower part of the interior of a ship's hull, especially when considered as storage space, as for cargo. In later merchant vessels it extended up through the decks to the underside of the weather deck.

Some ships have built in cranes and can load and unload their own cargo. Other ships must have dock side cranes or gantry cranes to load and unload.

Cargo hatch

A cargo hatch or deck hatch or hatchway is type of door used on ships and boats to cover the opening to the cargo hold or other lower part of the ship. To make the cargo hold waterproof, most cargo holds have cargo hatch. This can be a waterproof door, like a trap door with hinges or a cover that is places on top of the cargo hold opening, covered and held down with a tarp or a latching system. Cargo hatch can also be flexible and roll up on to a pole. A small cargo hatch to a small storage locker is called a Lazarette. Should a cargo hatch fail in a storm, the ship is at risk of sinking, such that has happened on bulk carrier hatches. Some ships that sank due to cargo hatch failure: MV Derbyshire, MV Christinaki, Bark Marques, SS Henry Steinbrenner, SS El Faro, SS Marine Electric, and the SS Edmund Fitzgerald. Most cargo hatches have a coaming, a raised edge around the hatch, to help keep out water. 
The term batten down the hatches is used prepare the ship for bad weather. This may included securing cargo hatch covers with wooden battens, to prevent water from entering from any angle. The term cargo hatch can also be a used for any deck opening leading to the cargo holds. Aircraft and spacecraft may also used the term for its cargo doors.
Basic types:»
 Lifting (up to remove)
 Rolling (rolls up on to a pole, trap type)
 Folding (fold up like paper or an accordion
 Sliding (slides on to the deck or over the side of ship)
 Roll stowing (roll up on to a pole, plates)

Gallery

See also 

Plug door
Cargo aircraft
Edward Edgar Foden
Ships with Holds:
 Container ship newer mode
 Liberty ship 
 Thames sailing barge
 Type C1 ship
 Type C2 ship
 Type C3 ship
 Victory ship

References

Notes

Sources
Sawyer, L.A. and W.H. Mitchell. Victory ships and tankers: The history of the ‘Victory’ type cargo ships and of the tankers built in the United States of America during World War II, Cornell Maritime Press, 1974, 0-87033-182-5.
United States Maritime Commission: 
Victory Cargo Ships

External links
SS Jeremiah O'Brien, Liberty museum ship moored at Fisherman's Wharf, San Francisco, California 
Liberty Ships built by the United States Maritime Commission in World War II
Liberty Ships and Victory Ships, America's Lifeline in War A lesson on Liberty ships and Victory ships from the National Park Service's Teaching with Historic Places.

Ship compartments
Shipping